Andrei Vladimirovich Semenov (also sometimes transliterated as Andrei Semyonov; born June 17, 1977) is a Russian mixed martial artist and Sambo practitioner. He has also made forays into acting.

Semenov has fought within the UFC middleweight division, in M-1 events and Pride Bushido, with an overall MMA record of 34 wins, 9 losses and 2 draws.  He has been fighting in Mixed Martial Arts since 1998, and is famed for excellent throws, strong submission defense, superior stamina and being very resilient and hard to finish.

Mixed martial arts career

M-1 Global
Three years after retiring in 2008, Semenov returned to MMA and fought Luigi Fioravanti at M-1 Challenge: 25 on April 28, 2011. Though a considerable underdog on media scoring websites, Semenov won the fight via unanimous decision. After another hiatus, Semenov returned on December 8, 2012, facing Michele Verginelli at M-1 Challenge: 36. He won via unanimous decision.

Semenov fought on October 20, 2013, defeating Gregor Herb at M-1 Challenge 42. He was then scheduled to face Ramazan Emeev at M-1 Challenge 47 on April 4, 2014, however in the weeks leading up to the event, the bout was cancelled for unknown reasons.

Ultimate Fighting Championship
With a 20-2 record, Semenov made his UFC debut on January 11, 2002, against notable BJJ black-belt Ricardo Almeida at UFC 35. Semenov won via TKO (punches).

He returned four months later on May 10, 2002, facing Ivan Salaverry at UFC 37. Semenov lost via TKO, and following the fight, Semenov left the UFC and returned to the M-1 Global promotion.

Championships and accomplishments
Mixed Martial Arts 
M-1 Global
Champion M-1 Global - Middleweight GP

Mixed martial arts record 

|-
| Win
| align=center| 34–9–2
| Gregor Herb
| Decision (unanimous)
| M-1 Challenge: 42
| 
| align=center| 3
| align=center| 5:00
| St. Petersburg, Russia
|
|-
| Win
| align=center| 33–9–2
| Michele Verginelli
| Decision (unanimous)
| M-1 Challenge: 36
| 
| align=center| 3
| align=center| 5:00
| Mytishchi, Russia
| 
|-
| Win
| align=center| 32–9–2
| Luigi Fioravanti
| Decision (unanimous)
| M-1 Challenge 25: Zavurov vs. Enomoto
| 
| align=center| 3
| align=center| 5:00
| Saint Petersburg, Russia
| 
|-
| Win
| align=center| 31–9–2
| Gregory Babene
| Decision (split)
| IAFC: Russia vs. the World
| 
| align=center| 3
| align=center| 5:00
| Novosibirsk, Russia
| 
|-
| Win
| align=center| 30–9–2
| Lubomir Guedjev
| TKO (strikes)
| fightFORCE: Russia vs. The World
| 
| align=center| 2
| align=center| 2:06
| St. Petersburg, Russia
| 
|-
| Win
| align=center| 29–9–2
| Emyr Bussade
| Decision (unanimous)
| BodogFIGHT - USA vs. Russia
| 
| align=center| 3
| align=center| 5:00
| Moscow, Russia
| 
|-
| Loss
| align=center| 28–9–2
| Jorge Santiago
| TKO (strikes)
| Bodog Fight - Clash of the Nations
| 
| align=center| 2
| align=center| 4:48
| St. Petersburg, Russia
| 
|-
| Win
| align=center| 28–8–2
| Matt Ewin
| TKO (strikes)
| Bodog Fight - Costa Rica
| 
| align=center| 1
| align=center| 0:43
| Costa Rica
| 
|-
| Loss
| align=center| 27–8–2
| Trevor Prangley
| Decision (unanimous)
| Bodog Fight - USA vs Russia
| 
| align=center| 3
| align=center| 5:00
| Vancouver, British Columbia, Canada
| 
|-
| Loss
| align=center| 27–7–2
| Gregory Bouchelaghem
| Decision
| M-1 MFC: Russia vs. France
| 
| align=center| 3
| align=center| 5:00
| St. Petersburg, Russia
| 
|-
| Loss
| align=center| 27–6–2
| Denis Kang
| Decision (unanimous)
| Pride: Bushido 8
| 
| align=center| 2
| align=center| 5:00
| Nagoya, Japan
| 
|-
| Win
| align=center| 27–5–2
| Matt Ewin
| Decision
| M-1 MFC: Heavyweight GP
| 
| align=center| 3
| align=center| 5:00
| Moscow, Russia
| 
|-
| Win
| align=center| 26–5–2
| Flavio Luiz Moura
| Decision
| M-1 MFC: Middleweight GP
| 
| align=center| 3
| align=center| 5:00
| St. Petersburg, Russia
| 
|-
| Win
| align=center| 25–5–2
| Azred Telkusheev
| Submission (rear-naked choke)
| M-1 MFC: Middleweight GP
| 
| align=center| 1
| align=center| 1:25
| St. Petersburg, Russia
| 
|-
| Win
| align=center| 24–5–2
| Martin Kampmann
| TKO (doctor stoppage)
| M-1 MFC: Middleweight GP
| 
| align=center| 1
| align=center| 1:21
| St. Petersburg, Russia
| 
|-
| Loss
| align=center| 23–5–2
| Trevor Prangley
| Decision (unanimous)
| Euphoria - Russia vs USA
| 
| align=center| 3
| align=center| 5:00
| Atlantic City, New Jersey, United States
| 
|-
| Draw
| align=center| 23–4–2
| Denis Kang
| Draw
| M-1 MFC - Russia vs. The World 7
| 
| align=center| 1
| align=center| 10:00
| St. Petersburg, Russia
| 
|-
| Win
| align=center| 23–4–1
| Chris Albandia
| TKO (cut)
| M-1 MFC - Russia vs. the World 6
| 
| align=center| 1
| align=center| 0:50
| Moscow, Russia
| 
|-
| Draw
| align=center| 22–4–1
| Mike Pyle
| Draw
| M-1 MFC - Russia vs. the World 5
| 
| align=center| 1
| align=center| 10:00
| St. Petersburg, Russia
| 
|-
| Win
| align=center| 22–4
| Curtis Stout
| Submission (rear naked choke)
| M-1 MFC - Russia vs. the World 4
| 
| align=center| 1
| align=center| 2:57
| St. Petersburg, Russia
| 
|-
| Loss
| align=center| 21–4
| Murad Chunkaiev
| Decision
| 2H2H 5 - Simply the Best 5
| 
| align=center| 2
| align=center| 3:00
| Rotterdam, Netherlands
| 
|-
| Loss
| align=center| 21–3
| Ivan Salaverry
| TKO (punches)
| UFC 37
| 
| align=center| 3
| align=center| 2:27
| Bossier City, Louisiana, United States
| 
|-
| Win
| align=center| 21–2
| Ricardo Almeida
| TKO (punches)
| UFC 35
| 
| align=center| 2
| align=center| 2:01
| Uncasville, Connecticut, United States
| 
|-
| Win
| align=center| 20–2
| Renato Vieira
| TKO (punches)
| M-1 MFC - Russia vs. the World 2
| 
| align=center| 1
| align=center| 1:01
| St. Petersburg, Russia
| 
|-
| Win
| align=center| 19–2
| Dave Dalgliesh
| Submission (armbar)
| 2H2H 3 - Hotter Than Hot
| 
| align=center| 1
| align=center| 2:32
| Rotterdam, Netherlands
| 
|-
| Win
| align=center| 18–2
| Tulio Palhares
| Submission (armbar)
| M-1 MFC - Russia vs. the World 1
| 
| align=center| 2
| align=center| 2:16
| St. Petersburg, Russia
| 
|-
| Win
| align=center| 17–2
| Martijn de Jong
| TKO (strikes)
| MillenniumSports: Veni Vidi Vici
| 
| align=center| N/A
| align=center| N/A
| Veenendaal, Netherlands
| 
|-
| Win
| align=center| 16–2
| Alexei Vezelozorov
| Submission (armbar)
| M-1 MFC - World Championship 2000
| 
| align=center| N/A
| align=center| N/A
| St. Petersburg, Russia
| 
|-
| Win
| align=center| 15–2
| Nikolai Onikienko
| Submission (armbar)
| M-1 MFC - World Championship 2000
| 
| align=center| N/A
| align=center| N/A
| St. Petersburg, Russia
| 
|-
| Win
| align=center| 14–2
| Adnan Durmus
| TKO (strikes)
| M-1 MFC - World Championship 2000
| 
| align=center| N/A
| align=center| N/A
| St. Petersburg, Russia
| 
|-
| Win
| align=center| 13–2
| Nikolai Onikienko
| Submission (armlock)
| M-1 MFC - CIS Cup 2000 Final
| 
| align=center| 1
| align=center| N/A
| Sochi, Russia
| 
|-
| Win
| align=center| 12–2
| Martijn de Jong
| Submission (guillotine choke)
| BOA 2 - Battle of Arnhem 2
| 
| align=center| N/A
| align=center| N/A
| Arnhem, Netherlands
| 
|-
| Loss
| align=center| 11–2
| Amar Suloev
| Submission (rear naked choke)
| WVC 11 - World Vale Tudo Championship 11
| 
| align=center| 1
| align=center| 1:47
| Recife, Brazil
| 
|-
| Win
| align=center| 11–1
| Phil Ensminger
| Submission (strikes)
| WVC 11 - World Vale Tudo Championship 11
| 
| align=center| 1
| align=center| 8:51
| Recife, Brazil
| 
|-
| Win
| align=center| 10–1
| Fabricio Madeirada
| Submission (strikes)
| WVC 11 - World Vale Tudo Championship 11
| 
| align=center| 1
| align=center| 3:48
| Recife, Brazil
| 
|-
| Loss
| align=center| 9–1
| Andrei Rudakov
| Decision
| IAFC - Pankration World Championship 2000 Day 2
| 
| align=center| 1
| align=center| N/A
| Moscow, Russia
| 
|-
| Win
| align=center| 9–0
| Daur Dyakaev
| Submission (rear-naked choke)
| IAFC - Pankration World Championship 2000 Day 1
| 
| align=center| 1
| align=center| 0:57
| Moscow, Russia
| 
|-
| Win
| align=center| 8–0
| Ilya Kudryashov
| Submission (armbar)
| M-1 MFC - European Championship 2000
| 
| align=center| 1
| align=center| 4:18
| St. Petersburg, Russia
| 
|-
| Win
| align=center| 7–0
| Rafles la Rose
| Submission (armbar)
| M-1 MFC - European Championship 2000
| 
| align=center| 1
| align=center| 5:12
| St. Petersburg, Russia
| 
|-
| Win
| align=center| 6–0
| Göksel Sahinbas
| TKO (punches)
| 2H2H 1 - 2 Hot 2 Handle
| 
| align=center| 1
| align=center| 3:28
| Rotterdam, Netherlands
| 
|-
| Win
| align=center| 5–0
| Sergei Zavadsky
| Submission (armbar)
| M-1 MFC - Russia Open Tournament
| 
| align=center| 1
| align=center| 0:57
| St. Petersburg, Russia
| 
|-
| Win
| align=center| 4–0
| Sergei Gur	
| Submission (armbar)
| M-1 MFC - Russia Open Tournament
| 
| align=center| 1
| align=center| 1:17
| St. Petersburg, Russia
| 
|-
| Win
| align=center| 3–0
| Darrel Gholar
| Decision
| M-1 MFC - World Championship 1999
| 
| align=center| 3
| align=center| 10:00
| St. Petersburg, Russia
| 
|-
| Win
| align=center| 2–0
| Amar Suloev
| Submission (armbar)
| M-1 MFC - World Championship 1999
| 
| align=center| 1
| align=center| 6:08
| St. Petersburg, Russia
| 
|-
| Win
| align=center| 1–0
| Ruslan Yacoupov
| Submission (armbar)
| M-1 MFC - World Championship 1998
| 
| align=center| 2
| align=center| 1:48
| St. Petersburg, Russia
|

Filmography
Among the films in which he has acted is the 2004 Russian film Dark Night (Темная ночь).

References

External links

Official UFC Profile

1977 births
Living people
People from Kineshma
Russian male mixed martial artists
Middleweight mixed martial artists
Russian sambo practitioners
Ultimate Fighting Championship male fighters
Mixed martial artists utilizing sambo
Mixed martial artists utilizing judo
Sportspeople from Ivanovo Oblast